Keratosis (from kerat- + -osis) is a growth of keratin on the skin or on mucous membranes stemming from keratinocytes, the prominent cell type in the epidermis. More specifically, it can refer to:
 actinic keratosis (also known as solar keratosis), a premalignant condition
 chronic scar keratosis
 hydrocarbon keratosis
 keratosis pilaris (KP, also known as follicular keratosis)
 seborrheic keratosis, not premalignant

See also
 Folliculitis
 Keratoderma

References

External links 

Dermatologic terminology